Hosseinabad-e Chahrahman is a village in Nosratabad Rural District (Sistan and Baluchestan Province), in the Mirjaveh of Zahedan County, Sistan and Baluchestan Province, Iran. At the 2006 census, its population was 220, in 38 families.

References 

Populated places in Zahedan County